Joseph Chapman D.D. was an English academic administrator at the University of Oxford.

Chapman was elected President (head) of Trinity College, Oxford in 1776, a post he held until 1808.
While President at Trinity College, Chapman was also Vice-Chancellor of Oxford University from 1784 until 1788. He died in 1808.

References

Year of birth missing
1808 deaths
Presidents of Trinity College, Oxford
Vice-Chancellors of the University of Oxford